Sadarashi is a village in Karimganj district of Assam state of India.

References

Villages in Karimganj district